Lactuca raddeana is a species of wild lettuce native to Vietnam, eastern China, the Korean peninsula, the Russian Far East, Sakhalin, the Kuril Islands, and Japan. A biennial or perennial, growing to 2m, it has a very wide range of variation in leaf shape, across a spectrum from undivided leaves to pinnatipartite leaves. It is edible but bitter.

Varieties
A variety is currently accepted:

Lactuca raddeana var. aogashimaensis (Kitam.) Katsuy.

References

raddeana
Plants described in 1874